Dysoxylum mollissimum,  commonly known as red bean, is a tree in the family Meliaceae. The specific epithet  is from the Latin meaning "very soft", referring to the leaf hairs. The tree is found from India and south China through Malesia to Australia and the western Pacific islands.

Subspecies
Two subspecies are recognised: D. mollissimum subsp. molle and D. mollissimum subsp. mollissimum.
Dysoxylum mollissimum subsp. molle: This subspecies occurs in Australia, Malesia and islands of the southwestern Pacific.
Dysoxylum mollissimum subsp. mollissimum: This subspecies occurs in India, China, Burma and Malesia.

References

mollissimum
Trees of China
Flora of tropical Asia
Trees of Australia
Flora of the Southwestern Pacific
Australasian realm flora
Indomalayan realm flora
Plants described in 1825